Woolley Edge services is a motorway service station on the M1 motorway within the borough of the City of Wakefield, West Yorkshire, England. It lies between junctions 38 and 39 close to West Bretton and west of the village of Woolley.

History
Both sites were opened in 1972 by Taverna (Esso). It was one of five sites in the UK sold to Granada in March 1973 for £2.5 million. The current owner is Moto. In 2006, Moto changed the branding to Marks and Spencer and Costa Coffee; also on site are the brands Burger King and Travelodge.

Structure
The services is split into two sites, one on the northbound and one on southbound sides of the M1. The two sites are connected by foot via a local road bridge over the motorway. There are local access roads from both sites onto the same bridge albeit but are not signed for the majority of traffic, and, as of 26 September 2009, both access roads were fitted with automatic barriers. The services are close to the Barnsley/South Yorkshire border. Despite the services being in  the Wakefield district, they're slightly closer to Barnsley than to the centre of Wakefield.

Woolley Edge is an interchange point for coaches operated by  Megabus. The Hallam Line, a railway between Leeds and Sheffield via Barnsley, passes directly beneath the service area and motorway, but there is no railway station with access to the site.

References

External links
Motorway Services Online - Woolley Edge Services
Moto Website - Woolley Edge

Buildings and structures in the City of Wakefield
Commercial buildings completed in 1971
M1 motorway service stations
Moto motorway service stations
Transport in West Yorkshire
Transport infrastructure completed in 1966